Wood Ridge is a flat-topped, ice-covered ridge, 7 nautical miles (13 km) long, extending in a north–south direction between Campbell and Styx Glaciers in the Southern Cross Mountains, Victoria Land. Mapped by United States Geological Survey (USGS) from surveys and U.S. Navy air photos, 1955–63. Named by Advisory Committee on Antarctic Names (US-ACAN) for Vernon P. Wood, U.S. Navy yeoman, a member of the McMurdo Station winter parties of 1963 and 1967.

Ridges of Victoria Land
Borchgrevink Coast